Julie Anne Payne (July 10, 1940 – June 7, 2019) was an American actress who appeared in television and films from 1959 to 1967.

Early life
A native of Los Angeles, Julie Anne Payne was the daughter of John Payne, film and television leading man of the 1930s, 1940s, and 1950s, and Anne Shirley, who started as a child actress in the late silent-early talkie period and became an ingenue and, later, leading lady of the late 1930s and early 1940s.  They were married from 1937 to 1943; Julie was their only child together.

Career 
Starting an eight-year television and film career, she made her debut at the age of 18 as the sole female in "The Pawn", the April 6, 1959 installment of her father's 1957–59 NBC western series, The Restless Gun, and subsequently appeared in episodes of One Step Beyond ("Premonition", seen on March 10, 1959, one month before the broadcast of her Restless Gun performance), Alfred Hitchcock Presents ("Graduating Class", December 27, 1959), The Tab Hunter Show ("I Love a Marine", October 30, 1960) and Dobie Gillis ("Goodbye, Mr. Pomfritt, Hello, Mr. Chips", June 13, 1961).

Her film appearances consisted of uncredited bits in the 1962 classic, The Manchurian Candidate, and Elvis Presley's 1965 musical, Girl Happy, as well as small credited supporting roles in 1964's Island of the Blue Dolphins and 1967's Don't Make Waves.

Her final two television performances were broadcast two days apart in 1965. On October 6 she was seen in "The Young Marauders", the fourth episode of ABC's new color western series, The Big Valley, playing the Southern-accented companion of the handsome head marauder, and, on October 8, in "The Night of Sudden Death", the fourth episode of CBS' new black-and-white (in color, starting with the 1966–67 season) western/spy/fantasy series, The Wild Wild West. Playing a fiery and seductive member of a mysterious troupe of traveling circus performers, she was prominently featured amidst the supporting cast and left the small screen on a high note.

Following a two-year break from acting, her one remaining credit, Don't Make Waves, a comedic satire on southern California beach lifestyle, which starred Tony Curtis, Claudia Cardinale, and Sharon Tate, spotlighted her in a brief bit as a beach beauty.

Personal life
Payne married actor Skip Ward in 1964 and they divorced the following year. In 1969, Payne met Academy Award-winning screenwriter Robert Towne; they married in 1977 and divorced in 1982. Their daughter, Katharine Towne (born 1978), began a career as an actress in 1998 and has appeared in numerous films and TV series. In 1999, she reconnected with her high school sweetheart, Steve Luckman, and they were together until her death.

Payne died at the age of 78 in June 2019 from chronic obstructive pulmonary disease.

Credits confused with those of another actress

Shortly after Julie Payne retired from her acting career, another actress named Julie Payne, born in 1946, who, in a 1976 interview, gave her birthplace as Sweet Home, Oregon, but has also been erroneously listed as being born in 1940 in Terre Haute, Indiana, began her own acting career, with an appearance in the 1970 film The Strawberry Statement. Subsequent references have frequently combined the credits of the two actresses.

Another Julie Payne (1951–2016) was a producer and miscellaneous crew, who often worked with director Ridley Scott. She died on 15 June 2016, and was mentioned in the ending credits of Scott's Alien: Covenant (2017).

Filmography

References

External links

1940 births
2019 deaths
Actresses from Los Angeles
American film actresses
American television actresses
20th-century American actresses
21st-century American women
Respiratory disease deaths in California
Deaths from chronic obstructive pulmonary disease